Kichlu, also spelt Kichloo or Kitchlew is a Kashmiri Pandit last-name and clan, originating in the Kashmir Valley of the Indian union territory of Jammu and Kashmir. The Kichlus are both Hindu and Muslim. The Kichlu sub-caste is a part of the larger Malmas gotras is one known as Paldeo Wasgaré, and this gotra embraces families belonging to the following Kráms, or tribal subdivisions: Sopuri-Pandit, Mála, Poot, Mirakhur, Kadlabaju, Kokru, Bangru, Bakáya, Khashu, Kichlu, Misri, Kar, and Mám.

Over time, some Kitchlews have migrated from the Kashmir Valley and have settled in other parts of India, as well as in neighbouring Pakistan.

Notable Kichlus
Ravi Kichlu
Saifuddin Kitchlew
Vijay Kichlu

References

Kashmiri tribes
Indian surnames
Hindu surnames
Kashmiri-language surnames
Social groups of Jammu and Kashmir
Social groups of India